Marcia Parsons (born 23 April 1948) is a Canadian speed skater. She competed in four events at the 1968 Winter Olympics.

References

1948 births
Living people
Canadian female speed skaters
Olympic speed skaters of Canada
Speed skaters at the 1968 Winter Olympics
Sportspeople from Red Deer, Alberta